Julio Horacio Lujambio Moreno (born 5 September 1945) is a Mexican politician affiliated with the Ecologist Green Party of Mexico. As of 2014 he served as Deputy of the LIX Legislature of the Mexican Congress representing the State of Mexico.

References

1945 births
Living people
People from Mexico City
Ecologist Green Party of Mexico politicians
Deputies of the LIX Legislature of Mexico
Members of the Chamber of Deputies (Mexico) for the State of Mexico